Enriqueta Favez  (c. 1791 – 1856) also known as Henriette Favez and Henrietta Faber, was a Swiss physician and surgeon who practiced medicine in the Napoleonic Wars and in Cuba. Although female, Favez lived as a male surgeon for approximately four years in Cuba—a fact that culminated in a well-documented trial and expulsion from the Spanish territories. Following her expulsion, she lived the remainder of her life as Sor Magdalena, a nurse for Daughters of Charity Services in New Orleans, eventually rising to the position of Mother Superior for that congregation.

Biography
Enriqueta Favez may have been born into a bourgeois family in Lausanne, Switzerland, around 1791. Her family origin is unverifiable, and undocumented. According to her own testimony, collected during a trial in Cuba, her parents died while she was an infant, and she was married to a French soldier at the age of 15 (c. 1806) by an uncle. Three years later, both her husband and infant daughter died. The former allegedly died in battle, the latter died for unknown reasons at eight days old.

Favez remained in Paris and took up the study of medicine at the Sorbonne, taking on the dress and identity of a male army officer with her deceased husband's rank. After Favez's graduation, she worked as a French army surgeon during the Napoleonic Wars, allegedly alongside her uncle, until she was captured by Wellington's forces in Spain, and imprisoned.

After the war, Favez left for Cuba. She was licensed by the medical board in Habana, and started a practice in Baracoa, then a small outpost in eastern Cuba. Her clients included the largely poor local population.

Eventually, Favez married an impoverished, mestizo woman from a neighboring town, Juana de Léon. Although Juana was most likely aware of the fact that Favez was female, there is lingering speculation about whether Juana knew of that fact when they were married.

Four years after her marriage to Juana, and successful integration into the elite in Baracoa, speculation about Favez' biological sex surfaced. Despite efforts to stem rumors, Favez was found inebriated, with her shirt unbuttoned, by a servant, who promptly informed the local authorities. Favez was arrested, imprisoned, and put on trial. The charges cited by the court included the illegal practice of medicine by a woman, fraud against the medical board and local authorities, and coercing a woman into disreputable marriage. Forcible examinations by local doctors revealed her sexual anatomy, and several accusatory letters allegedly written by Juana de Léon surfaced throughout her trial. Historical documents at his trial record that she defended himself against the charges by stating that she was a male spirit in a female body. Favez was declared guilty, and her marriage to Juana de Léon was annulled.

After deliberations, the court in Baracoa sought to place Favez in the Hospital de Paula de la ciudad de La Habana, in Havana, to serve a four-year sentence. The Hospital rejected this arrangement, and requested that Favez be transferred to La Casa de Recogidas de San Francisco de Paula, a secure institution housing female criminals, citing concerns over its own lack of security and "proper" supervision.

Following her second recorded suicide attempt, Favez was barred from the institution, as well as the Spanish territories, and placed on a ship to New Orleans, where she joined the Daughters of Charity Services as a nun. As Sor Magdalena, she continued to provide medical aid to the poor, and later became the Mother Superior of her Congregation. She died in New Orleans at the age of 65, having never returned to Cuba.

Legacy

Favez's story is documented in several books, including For Dressing Like a Man by Cuban historian Julio Cesar Gonzáles Pagés, whose publication was supported by the Swiss Agency for Development and Cooperation. The present article is based on documentary evidence and news digests of that book. Pagés, though referring to Favez as a woman confronting the challenges of her time and Favez's marriage as a lesbian one, also raised the possibility in an interview that Favez may have been a trans man.

The life of Favez is also the subject of a 2005 documentary film by director Lídice Pérez (see ) and a theatre play by the group Rita Montaner. In 2018, the Cuban-Swiss film Insumisas was released, with Sylvie Testud in the role of Enriqueta Favez.

See also
 James Barry (surgeon)

References

 
 For Dressing Like a Man. A New Book on Transexuality. Interview with Julio Cesar Gonzáles Pagés.

French military doctors
University of Paris alumni
Swiss LGBT people
1790s births
1856 deaths
People from Lausanne
19th-century Swiss people
Female wartime cross-dressers
19th-century Cuban people
Swiss expatriates in Cuba